HC Stadion Vrchlabí is an ice hockey team in Vrchlabí, Czech Republic. They play in the Czech 2.liga, the second level of ice hockey in the country. The club was founded in 1948. They were promoted to the 1.liga in 2007, by virtue of winning the Czech 2.liga. The organization folded due to financial problems in 2011. The club was almost immediately restarted, and has been playing in the Czech 2.liga since.

After season 2021/22, Vrchlabí resigned from the league and will play 2nd Czech Republic Hockey League.

Achievements
Czech 2.liga champion : 2007

External links
Official site

Ice hockey teams in the Czech Republic
Ice hockey clubs established in 1948
Sport in Hradec Králové Region
Trutnov District
Ice hockey teams in Czechoslovakia
1948 establishments in Czechoslovakia